Franco Silva (18 February 1920 – 10 November 1995) was an Italian actor.

Born in Genoa as Francesco Vistarini, Silva moved in Rome to attend the Centro Sperimentale di Cinematografia, from which he graduated in 1938; the following year he made his film debut in Ho visto brillare le stelle. Silva was mainly active between the 1950s and the mid-1960s; he was also active on stage and on television. Silva was the father of actress Mita Medici. and scriptwriter and novelist Carla Vistarini.

Partial filmography 

 Ho visto brillare le stelle (1939) - Mario
 Vietato ai minorenni (1944) - Lo studento in medicina
 The Lion of Amalfi (1950)
 Malavita (1951) - Serg. Mario
 The Wonderful Adventures of Guerrin Meschino (1952) - Bayazil
 Femmina senza cuore (1952) - Carlo
 The Queen of Sheba (1952) - Kabaal, commander of the Sheban army
 The Man from Cairo (1953) - Armeno
 Frine, Courtesan of Orient (1953) - Claus
 Mizar (Frogwoman) (1954) - comandante Luigi Ferri
 The Last Race (1954)
 The Count of Bragelonne (1954) - Boissière
 Processo all'amore (1955) - Enrico Mariani
 Canzone proibita (1956) - Paolo
 Allow Me, Daddy! (1956) - Gigi Biagi - Cognato di Rodolfo
 Occhi senza luce (1956) - Sandro
 Il canto dell'emigrante (1956) - Franco Lari
 Donne, amore e matrimoni (1956) - Corrado
 Il ricatto di un padre (1957) - Serpieri
 Song of Naples (1957) - Max Rambarzi
 Adorabili e bugiarde (1958) - Police Commissioner
 Hannibal (1959) - Maharbal
 Guardatele ma non toccatele (1959) - Morris Blond
 The Mongols (1961) - Stepen of Crakow
 The Count of Monte Cristo (1961) - Mario
 L'urlo dei bolidi (1961)
 Charge of the Black Lancers (1962) - Gamul
 The Tough and the Mighty (1969) - Arecu
 Questa libertà di avere... le ali bagnate (1971) - Robin
 The Assassination of Matteotti (1973)
 Spasmo (1974) - Luca
 Patrick Still Lives (1980) - Lyndon Kraft (final film role)

References

External links 
 

1920 births
1995 deaths
Italian male film actors
Actors from Genoa
Italian male television actors
Italian male stage actors
Centro Sperimentale di Cinematografia alumni
20th-century Italian male actors